Alive! is the first live album by the Polish heavy metal band Turbo. It was released in 1988 through Tonpress. The album was recorded on December 30, 1986, and April 3, 1987, at Metalmania '87 and Metal Battle '86 (Spodek, Katowice). The cover art was created by Jerzy Kurczak.

Track listing

Bonus tracks

Personnel
Wojciech Hoffmann - guitar
Grzegorz Kupczyk - vocal
Andrzej Łysów - guitar
Bogusz Rutkiewicz  - bass guitar
Tomasz Goehs - drums
Robert "Litza" Friedrich - guitar (tracks 14 and 15)

Release history

References

Turbo (Polish band) albums
1988 live albums
Polish-language albums